The 2022 WAFF U-18 Girls Championship was the third edition of the WAFF U-18 Girls Championship, the international women's football youth championship of Western Asia organized by the West Asian Football Federation (WAFF). It was held in Lebanon from 19 to 25 October 2022.

Host Lebanon entered two teams – Team A (U-18) and Team B (U-16) – due to the low number of the participating teams (three) after Palestine and Iraq withdrew from the tournament. Lebanon A finished the tournament in first place, after beating Syria 5–1 in the final; Jordan won 2–1 against Lebanon B to claim third place.

Teams
Four teams will compete in the tournament. Iraq and Palestine initially confirmed participation but announced their withdrawal before the draw.

Draw
The draw was held on 29 September 2022 at 13:00 UTC+3.

Squads

Players born between 1 January 2005 and 31 December 2009 are eligible to compete in the tournament.

Group stage

All times are local, AST (UTC+3).

Knockout stage

Third place play-off

Final

Player awards
The following awards were given at the conclusion of the tournament:

Goalscorers

References

U18 2022
WAFF U18
WAFF U18